Favartia burnayi is a species of sea snail, a marine gastropod mollusk in the family Muricidae, the murex snails or rock snails.

Description

Distribution
They are found in the waters of the Cape Verde Islands.

References
Notes

Bibliography
 Houart R. (1981) Favartia (Favartia) burnayi, espèce nouvelle de la sous-famille des Muricopsinae (Gastropoda: Muricidae). Informations de la Société Belge de Malacologie, ser. 9, 3: 79–82

Muricidae
Gastropods of Cape Verde
Endemic fauna of Cape Verde
Gastropods described in 1981